Campo Elías Delgado Morales (14 May 1934 – 4 December 1986) was a Colombian spree killer, former US serviceman and self-described Vietnam War veteran who killed 29 people, and wounded 12 more, most of them at an upscale Bogotá restaurant, before being shot dead by police.

Early life 
Delgado, born on 14 May 1934 in Chinácota, was the son of Elías Delgado and Rita Elisa Morales. He had a sister who resented him. In 1941, he saw his father commit suicide and held his mother responsible for this incident his entire life. He was said to have been an excellent student and studied medicine.

A refugee in the streets of New York City, he returned to Bogotá after a fight with a thief. Delgado then lived by teaching private English lessons and was taking graduate studies at the Universidad Javeriana in Bogotá. He was no longer able to develop friendships, for which he blamed his mother. As the years went by, he grew more and more resentful of her.

Military service 
According to the National Personnel Records Center, Delgado served with the United States Army from 12 August 1975, to 11 August 1978. He was honorably discharged as a Sergeant first class. According to these dates, it is impossible for him to have fought in Vietnam.

Fellow soldier Art Fealey, claims to have met Delgado in the 5th Infantry, 3rd Battalion while in the Panama Canal Zone in 1975. He said Delgado was later stationed at the Army's medical center in El Paso, Texas, until 1978.

Killing spree

Preparation 
On 3 December 1986, around noon, Delgado entered the Banco de Bogotá to close his bank account and withdraw his entire deposits of COP$49,896.93. When the cashier handed him a round number of COP$49,896.50, Delgado insisted on receiving the remaining 43 cents. Either during the afternoon of the same day, or the next morning, Delgado bought a .32-caliber Smith & Wesson Model 31-1 revolver and 500 rounds of ammunition.

Apartment buildings 
On 4 December, at approximately 2:00 p.m., Delgado went to an apartment building at Calle 118 No. 40–11 and entered apartment 304, where Nora Becerra de Rincón lived together with her  daughter Claudia Rincón, whom Delgado had given lessons in English, as well as her  son Julio Eduardo, her mother, and a friend of the latter. Besides Nora Becerra and her daughter, nobody was at home at that time. Delgado gagged and handcuffed Nora Becerra and fatally stabbed her four times with a hunting knife on the couch in the living room. He also gagged Claudia Rincón, and bound her hands and feet, before stabbing her 22 times and leaving her dead on a bed. The bodies were found the next day by Julio Eduardo.

At 4:00 p.m., Delgado was back at the apartment he shared with his mother at Carrera 7, Calle 52. Around 5:30 p.m., after a heated argument with her, he walked up behind Rita Delgado and killed her with a single stab to the back of the neck, afterwards wrapping her body in newspapers, sprinkling it with gasoline, and setting it on fire. Delgado then grabbed his revolver and a briefcase containing five boxes of ammunition and the knife, and ran through the apartment complex screaming "Fire! Fire!" He went downstairs and rang at apartment 301, where students Inés Gordi Galat and Nelsy Patricia Cortés were living, saying that he needed to call the fire department. As soon as they opened the door, Delgado killed both women with single shots to the head and then proceeded to apartment 302, where he did the same with Gloria Isabel Agudelo León, who had been alarmed by the shooting and opened the door to investigate.

Delgado then headed down to the first floor where he rang at apartment 101, again pretending that he needed to call the fire department. The apartment was occupied by four women, Mrs. Berta Gómez, who saved her life by jumping out into the courtyard, as well as students Matilde Rocío González, Mercedes Gamboa, and Claudia del Pilar Bermúdez Durán, who were all shot. González, who had already picked up the telephone receiver, and Gamboa both died at the scene, while Claudia Bermúdez died a few hours later in Hospital San José.

Outside the building, Delgado stared a couple of minutes at a poster, advertising a play of Blood Wedding at a local theater. Meanwhile, Berta Gómez stopped a police patrol and asked them for help, though, seeing the fire on the fourth floor, the officers responded that this was more a case for the firefighters and therefore did not intervene.

Delgado eventually left for house number 201 at Carrera 28A No. 51–31, where the Castro family was living, with whom he had been friends for five years. He arrived there about 15 minutes later in a rather agitated state. Against his habit of being a man of rather few words, Delgado talked incessantly, repeated sentences several times, and paced through the living room, declining any of Mrs. Castro's invitations to sit down. According to Clemencia de Castro, Delgado told her that he had come to say farewell, as he had bought a one way ticket and would go on a trip to the United States or China.

At 6:45 p.m., Delgado left the Castros, assuring them that they would soon hear from him, and went to Pizzería Pozzetto, an Italian restaurant in the Chapinero district where he ate frequently, discarding the hunting knife on his way. By that time police and journalists were searching for the murderer throughout the city.

Restaurant Pozzetto 
Delgado arrived at the restaurant at around 7:15 p.m., greeted the waiters and ordered half a bottle of red wine and spaghetti bolognese. The waiters noticed that during his meal Delgado went to the restroom several times. After finishing his meal Delgado began to read an American magazine, ordered two screwdriver cocktails, and paid his bill. After drinking a third vodka at around quarter past eight he sat down at the bar to have a fourth.

Around 9:15 p.m., Delgado opened fire on the diners. Delgado shot a total of 32 people, 20 of them fatally. His method was to corner his victim and shoot them at point-blank range in the forehead and then move on to the next victim. Delgado promised not to kill any children, but he accidentally killed a six-year-old girl sitting at an adjacent table when his revolver misfired. When police arrived ten minutes later, Delgado turned his attention to them, holding them off for one minute. He was apparently killed with a shot to the temple by a police officer. There is also a belief that Delgado committed suicide. After some time, police discovered with a comparison of the bullets that Delgado was shot by a police officer while he was reloading.

Victims 

Fatalities
 Nora Isabel Becerra de Rincón,
 Claudia Marcela Rincón, 14, daughter of Nora Becerra
 Rita Elisa Morales de Delgado, Delgado's mother
 Gloria Isabel Agudelo León, 50
 Gloria Inés Gordi Galat
 Nelsy Patricia Cortés, 26
 Matilde Rocío González Rojas, 23
 Mercedes Gamboa Gonzáles, 20
 Claudia del Pilar Bermúdez Durán
 Diana Cuevas, 45, executive of Revista Cromos
 Carlos Alfredo Cabal Cabal, leader of the Nuevo Liberalismo in Valle
 Consuelo Pezantes Andrade
 Antonio Maximiliano Pezantes
 Hernando Ladino Benavides, 41
 Grace Guzmán Valenzuela
 Giorgio Pindi Vanelli
 Judith Glogower Lester
 Zulemita Glogower Lester
 Alvaro J. Montes
 Jairo Enrique Gómez Remolina, director of Revista Vea
 Rita Julia Valenzuela de Guzmán, 51
 Andrés Montaño Figueroa
 Alvaro Pérez Buitrago, major in the Colombian military
 Sonia Adriana Alvarado
 Guillermo Umaña Montoya
 Margie Cubillos Garzón, 6
 Laureano Bautista Fajardo
 Sandra Henao de López

Injured
 Victor Mauricio Pérez Serrano
 Maribel Arce de Pérez
 Juliet Robledo
 Judith Glogower Lester
 Miriam Ortiz de Parrado
 Alfonso Cubillos
 Yolanda Garzón de Cubillos
 John Cubillos Garzón
 Pedro José Sarmiento
 Unnamed victim
 Unnamed victim
 Unnamed victim

In popular culture 
In 2002, Colombian writer Mario Mendoza Zambrano published Satanás, a novel that analyzes the case of Delgado. The book was very successful and received several international awards. Mendoza Zambrano met Delgado at the university in Bogotá when he was a literature student, and he actually talked to Delgado just a couple of days before the massacre.

In 2007, Colombian producer Rodrigo Guerrero and director Andi Baíz adapted the book into a film, Satanás.

See also 
 List of rampage killers in the Americas

References

Bibliography 
 

1934 births
1986 deaths
Attacks on restaurants in South America
Colombian mass murderers
Colombian murderers of children
Colombian spree killers
Mass murder in 1986
Mass murder in Colombia
1986 murders in North America
People from Norte de Santander Department
People shot dead by law enforcement officers in Colombia
United States Army non-commissioned officers